Sanduqlu (also Romanized as Şandūqlū) is a village in Sain Rural District, in the Central District of Sarab County, East Azerbaijan Province, Iran. At the 2006 census, its population was 80, in 19 families.

References 

Populated places in Sarab County